Peggy Hennessey was a British film editor active in the 1930s and 1940s.

Biography 
After starting out as an assistant at Ealing Studios, she made the lead to lead editor after successfully cutting a film for American director Al Parker in two days. In those early days, she learned from David Lean.

Selected filmography 

 You Will Remember (1941)
 The Gang (1938)
 Nobody Home (1938)
 A Royal Divorce (1938)
 The Rat (1937)

References

External links 

 

British women film editors
British film editors